Autopax is a holding company of two South African intercity bus services and is a wholly owned subsidiary of Passenger Rail Agency of South Africa (Prasa). Its mandate is to provide long distance inter-city and charter services as well bus services crossing borders in Southern Africa via the use of luxury, semi-luxury and intercity coaches.

Background
Autopax Passenger Services (SOC) Ltd has its origins in the old state organization called the South African Road Transport Services that offered two services that at the time that were called, Translux and Transtate. In the 1990s, it became part of Autonet, a division of Transnet. Autonet would later be corporatised and is now called Autopax Passenger Services (Pty) Ltd and became part of Passenger Rail Agency of South Africa when that organization was formed in March 2009.

Services
Autopax offers two styles of bus services and charter service:

TransLux
 This brand offers luxury bus travel using single and double decker buses between major cities and towns throughout South Africa.

City-to-City
 This brand offers a no frills semi-luxury bus travel between the major centres in South Africa and offers routes into Southern African countries such as Eswatini, Lesotho, Malawi, Mozambique, Zambia and Zimbabwe.

Autopax Charters
 This brand offers a bus hire service.

Other services of by Autopax are emergency bus services for rail emergencies in PRASA Rails business. It also offers commuter bus service in Gauteng for the provinces Department of Transport since July 2015, with the contract extended until March 2017.

References

External links 
 Passenger Rail Agency of South Africa
 Metrorail
 Shosholoza Meyl

Bus companies of South Africa
Transport operators of South Africa